The Canon PowerShot A is a now discontinued series of digital cameras released by Canon. The A-series started as a budget line of cameras, although over time its feature set varied from low-end point-and-shoot cameras to high-end prosumer cameras capable of rivalling Canon's G-series.

Models

The series began with the A5 series, which was a very basic point-and-shoot camera line. The Axx series that followed offered full manual control (on most models) in a fairly bulky body. The A100/200/3xx/4xx series cameras are stripped-down with very little manual controls. The Axx series has branched off into the A5xx (replaced by the A1xxx series), A6xx, and A7xx series (the latter replaced by the A2xxx series). A-series camera are generally powered by 2 AA batteries.

Features

Software by Breezesys adds remote capture capability from a computer over the USB interface on early Canon PowerShot A models until around 2006. More recent models generally do not support remote capture.

Many models from the A450 to the A720 can run the CHDK firmware add-on adding features such as recording raw image files and remotely triggering the camera shutter using a USB cable.

Sample photographs

See also 
 Canon PowerShot
 Canon PowerShot G
 Canon PowerShot S
 Canon Digital IXUS or PowerShot Digital ELPH

References

External links 

A